Shelagyote Peak is the highest mountain in the Sicintine Range of the Skeena Mountains in northern British Columbia, Canada, located at the head of Barger Creek.

References

Two-thousanders of British Columbia
Skeena Mountains
Cassiar Land District